Quioquitani Zapotec, or Quioquitani-Quierí Zapotec (Zapoteco de Quioquitani y Quierí), natively Tiits Së, is a Zapotec language of Oaxaca, Mexico.

San Pedro Leapi Zapotec is divergent, and perhaps a separate language.

References

Zapotec languages